The Bachelors (Spanish: Los solterones) is a 1953 Mexican musical comedy film directed by Miguel M. Delgado and starring Luis Aguilar, Rosita Arenas, and Andrés Soler.

Partial cast
 Luis Aguilar as Gonzalo  
 Rosita Arenas as Sebastiana  
 Andrés Soler as Don Rafael Gandia  
 Carlos Agostí as Carlos  
 Carlota Solares as Eva Mariño  
 Eduardo Alcaraz as Gerente hotel  
 José Muñoz 
 José Pardavé 
 Enrique Díaz 'Indiano' as Don Procopio  
 Elisa Quintanilla 
 Pedro Elviro 
 Rafael Icardo as Don Lauro  
 Álvaro Matute 
 Elena Luquín 
 Carmen Ignarra as Magda

References

Bibliography 
 María Luisa Amador. Cartelera cinematográfica, 1950-1959. UNAM, 1985.

External links 
 

1953 films
1953 musical comedy films
Mexican musical comedy films
1950s Spanish-language films
Films directed by Miguel M. Delgado
Mexican black-and-white films
1950s Mexican films